Limp Richerds were an American hardcore punk rock band from Federal Way, Washington which briefly featured Mark Arm and Steve Turner (later of Mudhoney and Green River) in one of their many lineups.  They formed around 1981, but ceased to be a serious band in 1984, and finally split in 1987. The original lineup was Dave Middleton (vocals), Ross Guffy (percussion), Charles Quain (guitar), and Greg Billings (bass). The band was centered on the vocals and songwriting of Dave Middleton.

Discography
"Bob Hope's USO El Salvador Show 1983" on the Public Doesn't Exist cassette compilation
"Death to Ivars" and "Non-Conformity Sox (live)" on the What Syndrome cassette compilation
"My Dad Forgot His Rubber and I Was the Result" on the Sub Pop 9 cassette compilation
split '7"' with A Rancid Vat (fake 7" single that came with a cassette of material by both bands)

External links
Dementlieu Punk Archive: Limp Richerds fan page with interview, discography, and photos

Punk rock groups from Washington (state)
Musical groups established in 1981
Musical groups disestablished in 1987